Sakété is a city of the Plateau Department of Benin. The commune covers an area of 432 square kilometres and as of 2013 had a population of 114,207 people. It is the birthplace of politician Rafiatou Karimou.

References

Communes of Benin
Arrondissements of Benin
Populated places in the Plateau Department